Kedron of Alexandria, also called Kedronos, was the 4th Patriarch of Alexandria. 

When the priest and Bishops who served in the country learned that the Bishop Avilius, Patriarch of Alexandria had died, they gathered in Alexandria to consult with the Christian people there, and elected Kedronos as successor. It was said that he was among those who had been baptized by Saint Mark, and he was enthroned Patriarch in Babab (October), in 96 AD, during the reign of the Emperor Nerva.

Kedron was arrested and martyred in the persecution under the Emperor Trajan. It was said that the reason for the arrest was that one of the Roman governors had said to him, “Why do you not have our gods partake with your God and continue to worship him?" So he answered, “Because we do not prostrate before any other.” His martyrdom took place on the 21st of Paoni (28 June), in 106 AD. 

Kedron was known as chaste and virtuous. He led the Church for eleven years, one month, and twelve days.

References 
General

Atiya, Aziz S. The Coptic Encyclopedia. New York: Macmillan Publishing Co., 1991.

External links 
 The Official website of the Coptic Orthodox Pope of Alexandria and Patriarch of All Africa on the Holy See of Saint Mark the Apostle
 Coptic Documents in French

106 deaths
1st-century Popes and Patriarchs of Alexandria
Saints from Roman Egypt
2nd-century Popes and Patriarchs of Alexandria
2nd-century Christian saints
Year of birth unknown